Lake Nisramont (French: lac de Nisramont) is located in Wallonia in the south-east of Belgium on the river Ourthe in the municipality of La Roche-en-Ardenne, province of Luxembourg. 

It is named after Nisramont, a village near the lake. The dam has a length of 116 m and is 16 m high. The volume of water is 3,000,000 m³ and the area of the lake is 0.47 km². The dam has fish ladders and a hydro-electric power station. The dam was erected at the point where the Western Ourthe (Ourthe Occidentale) and Eastern Ourthe (Ourthe Orientale) merge to form the Ourthe. The lake is a tourist attraction, with water sports, including canoeing and fishing.

See also
 

Reservoirs in Belgium
Lakes of the Ardennes (Belgium)
Lakes of Luxembourg (Belgium)
Lake Nisramont